Radosław Rybak (born 25 March 1973) is a former Polish volleyball player, a member of Poland men's national volleyball team in 2002–2004, a participant of the 2004 Olympic Games, 2004 Polish Champion.

Career
In 2004 he achieved title of Polish Champion with club Ivett Jastrzębie Borynia. He ended up his career after season 2010/11, when he was a player of Pamapol Siatkarz Wieluń in 1st Polish League.

Other
He is the chairman of the club Espadon Szczecin, which was built on the basis of the old club Morze Bałtyk Szczecin. Since 2016 his club has been played in PlusLiga.

Sporting achievements

Clubs

National championships
 2003/2004  Polish Championship, with Ivett Jastrzębie Borynia

References

1973 births
Living people
People from Rawa Mazowiecka
Sportspeople from Łódź Voivodeship
Polish men's volleyball players
Volleyball players at the 2004 Summer Olympics
Olympic volleyball players of Poland
AZS Olsztyn players
Jastrzębski Węgiel players
Projekt Warsaw players